Easton (formerly, Covel and Covell) is a census-designated place (CDP) in Fresno County, California, United States. The population was 2,083 at the 2010 census, up from 1,966 at the 2000 census.

Geography

History
Easton post office was established in 1881, moved in 1883, and closed in 1902. It reopened in 1952. The name honors O.W. Easton, a land agent.

Demographics

2010
The 2010 United States Census reported that Easton had a population of 2,083. The racial makeup of Easton was 1,248 (59.9%) White, 13 (0.6%) African American, 58 (2.8%) Native American, 68 (3.3%) Asian, 0 (0.0%) Pacific Islander, 593 (28.5%) from other races, and 103 (4.9%) from two or more races. Hispanic or Latino of any race were 1,308 persons (62.8%).

The Census reported that 2,083 people (100% of the population) lived in households, 0 (0%) lived in non-institutionalized group quarters, and 0 (0%) were institutionalized.

There were 629 households, out of which 266 (42.3%) had children under the age of 18 living in them, 369 (58.7%) were opposite-sex married couples living together, 91 (14.5%) had a female householder with no husband present, 50 (7.9%) had a male householder with no wife present.  There were 32 (5.1%) unmarried opposite-sex partnerships, and 5 (0.8%) same-sex married couples or partnerships. 102 households (16.2%) were made up of individuals, and 46 (7.3%) had someone living alone who was 65 years of age or older. The average household size was 3.31.  There were 510 families (81.1% of all households); the average family size was 3.66.

The population was spread out, with 566 people (27.2%) under the age of 18, 231 people (11.1%) aged 18 to 24, 474 people (22.8%) aged 25 to 44, 532 people (25.5%) aged 45 to 64, and 280 people (13.4%) who were 65 years of age or older.  The median age was 35.1 years. For every 100 females, there were 104.0 males.  For every 100 females age 18 and over, there were 101.7 males.

The homeowner vacancy rate was 1.2%; the rental vacancy rate was 5.5%.  1,365 people (65.5% of the population) lived in owner-occupied housing units and 718 people (34.5%) lived in rental housing units.

2000
As of the census of 2000, there were 1,966 people, 623 households, and 499 families residing in the CDP. The racial makeup of the CDP was 58.04% White, 0.61% Black or African American, 3.36% Native American, 3.97% Asian, 29.35% from other races, and 4.68% from two or more races.  51.78% of the population were Hispanic or Latino of any race.

There were 623 households, out of which 35.2% had children under the age of 18 living with them, 62.3% were married couples living together, 12.4% had a female householder with no husband present, and 19.9% were non-families. 17.5% of all households were made up of individuals, and 8.3% had someone living alone who was 65 years of age or older.  The average household size was 3.16 and the average family size was 3.57.

In the CDP, the population was spread out, with 30.2% under the age of 18, 8.6% from 18 to 24, 24.8% from 25 to 44, 23.0% from 45 to 64, and 13.3% who were 65 years of age or older.  The median age was 35 years. For every 100 females, there were 102.3 males.  For every 100 females age 18 and over, there were 95.7 males.

The median income for a household in the CDP was $31,172, and the median income for a family was $36,250. Males had a median income of $39,583 versus $21,071 for females. The per capita income for the CDP was $13,598.  About 16.8% of families and 24.0% of the population were below the poverty line, including 37.7% of those under age 18 and 11.2% of those age 65 or over.

Notable residents

Marjaree Mason, for whom Fresno County's Marjaree Mason Center is named, was born in Easton.
Deshawn Stevenson, basketball player for the Dallas Mavericks, lived in Easton.
Matt Garza, Major League Baseball pitcher for the Chicago Cubs, grew up and attended high school in Easton.

References

Census-designated places in Fresno County, California
Populated places established in 1881
Census-designated places in California
1881 establishments in California